Neoechinorhynchida is an order of parasitic worms from the phylum Acanthocephala. It contains 3 families:

 Dendronucleatidae Sokolovskaja, 1962
 Neoechinorhynchidae Ward, 1917
 Tenuisentidae Van Cleave, 1936

References

 
Eoacanthocephala
Protostome orders